Chrysidimyia is a genus of hoverflies from Brazil, with only one known species, Chrysidimyia chrysidimima. The genus was described as a small metallic green fly with dense punctation that had an "astonishing resemblance" to chrysidid wasps.

References

Hoverfly genera
Microdontinae
Diptera of South America
Monotypic Diptera genera